Ignace Cotolendi, MEP (23 March 1630 – 16 August 1662) was a French bishop. He was a founding member of the Paris Foreign Missions Society and became a missionary in Asia.

Life
Born in Brignoles, Var, Cotolendi was recruited  by Alexander de Rhodes, SJ, as a secular clergy volunteer to become a missionary in Asia, together with François Pallu and Pierre Lambert de la Motte. These were sent to the Far-East as Apostolic vicars.

In 1660 Ignace Cotolendi was nominated as titular Bishop of Metellopolis and Vicar Apostolic of Nanjing, with three regions of northeastern China, Tartary and Korea under his responsibility. On 6 November 1660, he was consecrated bishop in Paris by François de Harlay de Champvallon, Archbishop of Rouen with Toussaint de Forbin de Janson, Titular Bishop of Philadelphia in Arabia, and François Pallu, Titular Bishop of Heliopolis in Augustamnica, serving as co-consecrators. He was the first Bishop of what is now the Archdiocese of Nanjing.

The three bishops left France (1660–62) to go to their respective missions, and crossed Persia and India on foot, since Portugal would have refused to take non-Padroado missionaries by ship, and the Dutch and the English refused to take Catholic missionaries. Cotolendi left with three missionaries on 3 September 1661. After travelling overland to India, Ignace Cotolendi died near Masulipatam as he was waiting for his passage to Siam.

See also
France-Thailand relations

Notes

References
Mantienne, Frédéric 1999 Monseigneur Pigneau de Béhaine Eglises d'Asie, Série Histoire,  
Missions étrangères de Paris. 350 ans au service du Christ 2008 Editeurs Malesherbes Publications, Paris 

1630 births
1662 deaths
French Roman Catholic titular bishops
Paris Foreign Missions Society missionaries
French Roman Catholic missionaries
French Roman Catholic bishops in Asia
Roman Catholic missionaries in China
French expatriates in China